This is the complete discography of hip hop band Gym Class Heroes.

After the addition of guitarist Disashi Lumumba-Kasongo and bassist Eric Roberts in 2003, the group was signed to Fueled by Ramen and Decaydance Records, on which they released their debut album, The Papercut Chronicles.  The group gained a strong fan base while promoting the album, appearing at festivals such as The Bamboozle and Warped Tour. In 2006, the group released the gold-selling album As Cruel as School Children. Since that release, the band's single "Cupid's Chokehold" reached number four on the Billboard Hot 100, and "Clothes Off!!" peaked at number five in the United Kingdom. On September 9, 2008, Gym Class Heroes released their third album, The Quilt, which contained numerous collaborations with other artists.  
 
The band went on hiatus in 2009, a time in which the members pursued various side projects. Travie McCoy released his solo debut album Lazarus in June 2010. Lumumba-Kasongo has been working on his side-project Soul, while McGinley now drums in the rock group Kill the Frontman. The group released The Papercut Chronicles II on November 15, 2011.

Albums

Studio albums

Demo albums

EPs

Singles

Promotional singles

Other contributions

Music videos

References

Discographies of American artists
Rock music group discographies